The National Board of Accreditation (NBA) is one of the two major bodies responsible for accreditation of higher education institutions in India, along with the National Assessment and Accreditation Council (NAAC). NBA accredits technical programmes, such engineering and management programmes, while NAAC accredits general colleges and universities. NBA is a full member of the Washington Accord.

History
NBA was established by the All India Council for Technical Education (AICTE) in 1994 and operated as an autonomous body since 2010. In 2014 it was granted a full membership status in the Washington Accord.

Programs accredited 
The NBA accredits programmes and not institutes. These include diplomas, undergraduate and postgraduate programs. Accredited fields include engineering & technology, management, pharmacy, architecture, applied arts and crafts, computer applications and hospitality and tourism management.

While accreditation is voluntary, in 2017 the AICTE announced that it will not provide approval for institutes which failed to accredit at least half of their programs.

See also
University Grants Commission (India), a related higher education body

References

External links
 
 List of AICTE Approved Institutions having NBA Accredited Courses

1994 establishments in Delhi
College accreditors in India
Government agencies established in 1994